1 Less G n Da Hood is the debut studio album by American rapper Blaze Ya Dead Homie. Released on October 16, 2001, the album is his second release on the Psychopathic label, following his self-titled debut EP. 1 Less G n Da Hood was produced by Twiztid, Mike Puwal, Fritz "the Cat" Van Kosky, and Violent J, and features appearances by guests Anybody Killa, Monoxide Child, Violent J, Jamie Madrox, and Shaggy 2 Dope.

Reception
Allrovi wrote, "Combining the seriousness of a violent life in the ghetto with the juvenile antics of the Insane Clown Posse doesn't quite sound like a formula for success, but Detroit rapper and ICP affiliate Blaze somehow made it work".

Reissue
In 2006, the album was reissued under the title 1 Less G in the Hood: Deluxe G Edition. The reissue contained material from Blaze's self-titled EP, the 2001 album, and three additional bonus tracks. The reissue also deleted the introduction "The Eulogy", which was replaced by the Blaze Ya Dead Homie EP intro, and the songs "Str8 Outta Detroit", "Here I Am" and "Hatchet Execution", which remain unavailable due to the fact that the original version of 1 Less G N Da Hood is out of print and these tracks did not appear on any other albums.

1 Less G In The Hood: Deluxe G Edition peaked at #19 on the Billboard Top Heatseekers chart, #25 on the Top Independent Albums chart, and #86 on the Top R&B/Hip-Hop Albums chart.

Legacy
The album is widely considered a "Juggalo Classic" as it was a big hit for Blaze with it being dubbed "Blaze's own "'The Great Milenko'".

In early June 2017 it was announced that Blaze Ya Dead Homie would be performing 1 Less G N Da Hood in its entirety at Attack Of The Ninjas 2017 Afterparty.

Track listing

Personnel
Blaze Ya Dead Homie – Vocals
Anybody Killa – Performer
Jamie Madrox – Vocals
Monoxide – Performer
Sabrina – Vocals
Shaggy 2 Dope – Cut
Jami Spittler – Graphic Design, Concept
Twiztid – Producer
Violent J – Vocals, Producer
Eric "EWolf" Wheeler – Photography
Chyna Dawl- voicemail vocals

Charts

Deluxe G Edition

References

2001 debut albums
Blaze Ya Dead Homie albums
Psychopathic Records albums
Albums produced by Joseph Bruce
Albums produced by Mike Puwal
Albums produced by Jamie Spaniolo
Albums produced by Paul Methric